Ndombe (Dombe) is a Bantu language of Angola. It was assigned by Guthrie to Bantu group R.10, which apart from Umbundu Pfouts (2003) established as part of the Kavango–Southwest branch of Bantu. Though not specifically addressed, Ndombe may be in that branch as well.

There is no standard form of Ndombe, nor an established writing system.

References

Kavango languages